Make Me Famous is a 2021 documentary that explores the life and work of painter Edward Brezinski in his quest for fame.

Critical reception
The Hollywood Reporter wrote "The first half of the project breathlessly divulges as much information about Brzezinski as possible, sketching his character through his makeshift community’s vision. There is a straightforward tone, an uncomplicated visual style, and a focus on the interviewees’ stories and ideas, which occasionally take one too many tangents. Suddenly it all changes, and Make Me Famous adopts a true-crime quality."

The Guardian called the film a "touching documentary revisits the grimy Manhattan of the 70s and 80s in search of long-lost painter Edward Brezinski."

References

External links

2021 films
2020s English-language films
American documentary films
2021 documentary films